Sphingopyxis taejonensis is a bacterium from the genus of Sphingopyxis which has been isolated from natural mineral water from Taejon in Korea.

References

Sphingomonadales
Bacteria described in 2001